Kingussie railway station serves the town of Kingussie, Inverness-shire in the Highland Council Area of Scotland.

History 
The current station buildings date from 1893 by the architect William Roberts.

The I&PJ amalgamated with other railways to form the Highland Railway (HR) in 1865, and at the 1923 Grouping the HR became part of the newly formed London, Midland and Scottish Railway.

The station was host to a LMS caravan in 1935 and 1936 followed by two caravans from 1937 to 1939. A camping coach was also positioned here by the Scottish Region from 1953 to 1963, increasing to two coaches from 1964 to 1967.

There are two platforms, both of conventional height. The Up line platform used to be at a slightly lower height, which was originally built to allow cattle to easily transfer to and from the wagons, and onto the adjacent market stance to the south of the station. This meant passengers had to be careful when alighting from a train as not all doors were given a portable step on the platform, and was not good for those with accessibility issues. In 2017, the platform was rebuilt to standard height. The station buildings are on the Down platform.

Location 
The station is located in Ruthven Road, Kingussie, about 200 yards south-east of the High Street. Kingussie High School is close to the station, as are also the Highland Council offices serving the Badenoch and Strathspey area. A level crossing takes Ruthven Road over both tracks at the Inverness end of the station, with the local signal box at the same end of platform 2.

Facilities 
Both platforms have benches and help points. Platform 2 has a separate waiting room, whilst shelter on platform 1 is provided by the station buildings. In the station buildings is a ticket office and toilets. Only platform 1 is step-free; platform 2 can only be accessed by the footbridge. There is a car park and cycle racks adjacent to platform 1.

Platform layout 
Platform 1 on the northbound line can accommodate trains having twelve coaches, whereas platform 2 on the southbound line can hold thirteen.

Passenger volume 

The statistics cover twelve month periods that start in April.

Future proposals 
In the future, this station will be one of those to benefit from a package of timetable enhancements introduced by Transport Scotland and Scotrail.  The current Perth to Inverness timetable will increase to hourly each way, with trains south of there running on alternate hours to Edinburgh & Glasgow. Journey times will be reduced by 10 minutes to both cities. As of May 2022, this has still not taken place.

Services 

In the May 2022 timetable, there are twelve daily departures southbound (five to Edinburgh, seven to Glasgow Queen Street) and twelve departures northbound (the latter including one originating from Kingussie) on weekdays and Saturdays, including the Caledonian Sleeper (Sun-Fri nights southbound, calls to pick up only; Mon-Sat northbound).

On Sundays there are seven departures northbound and eight southbound, including the Kings Cross train, along with the sleeper heading southbound.

References

External Links 

 Video footage of the station on YouTube

Railway stations in Highland (council area)
Former Highland Railway stations
Railway stations in Great Britain opened in 1863
Railway stations served by ScotRail
Railway stations served by Caledonian Sleeper
Railway stations served by London North Eastern Railway
Category B listed buildings in Highland (council area)
Listed railway stations in Scotland
Kingussie
William Roberts railway stations